Frank Edwin Guilford (July 1, 1928 – July 27, 2020) was a politician in the American state of Florida. He served in the Florida House of Representatives from 1962 to 1966, representing Calhoun County.

References

1928 births
2020 deaths
Members of the Florida House of Representatives
Florida State University alumni